Kaka Khel is a town and union council of Lakki Marwat District in Khyber Pakhtunkhwa province of Pakistan. It is located at 32°32'59N 70°47'44E and has an altitude of 307 metres (1010 feet).

References

Union councils of Lakki Marwat District
Populated places in Lakki Marwat District